Anxiety (Spanish: Ansiedad) is a 1953 Mexican musical drama film directed by Miguel Zacarías and starring Pedro Infante, Libertad Lamarque and Irma Dorantes.

Cast 
 Pedro Infante as Carlos Iturbe y Valdivia / Gabriel Lara / Rafael Lara
 Libertad Lamarque as María de Lara
 Irma Dorantes as Isabel Valdivia
 Arturo Soto Rangel as Don Lorenzo
 Guillermo Samperio as Policia
 Salvador Quiroz as Doctor
 José Muñoz as Asesino
 Miguel Funes hijo as Rafaelito
 Hernán Vera as Cantinero 1
 Felipe Montoya as Agente teatral
 Jorge Sareli as Investigador privado
 Chel López as Taxista
 José Pidal as Invitado a fiesta
 Marion de Lagos as Enfermera
 Ricardo Adalid as Locutor radio
 Manuel Casanueva as Invitado a fiesta
 Velia Lupercio as Invitada a fiesta
 Concepción Martínez as Espectadora programa de radio
 Carlos Robles Gil as Espectador programa radio
 Humberto Rodríguez as Empleado teatro

References

Bibliography 
 Amador, María Luisa. Cartelera cinematográfica, 1950-1959. UNAM, 1985.

External links 
 

1953 films
1950s musical drama films
Mexican musical drama films
1950s Spanish-language films
Films directed by Miguel Zacarías
1953 drama films
Mexican black-and-white films
1950s Mexican films